Steven Bowditch (born 8 June 1983) is an Australian professional golfer who currently plays on the PGA Tour and the PGA Tour of Australasia.

Bowditch was born in Newcastle, New South Wales. He had a distinguished amateur career, which includes medalist honours at the 2001 Australian Amateur.

Bowditch plays on the PGA Tour of Australasia and previously played on its developmental Von Nida Tour. He also plays in the United States, where he has alternated between the PGA Tour and the Nationwide Tour for varied success. He won the 2005 Jacob's Creek Open Championship, co-sanctioned by the PGA Tour of Australasia and the Nationwide Tour, on the way to finishing fourth on the Nationwide Tour's money list. This earned Bowditch a PGA Tour card for the first time in 2006. He played in 22 events, but only made two cuts in his debut season and returned to the Nationwide Tour in 2007.

Bowditch won for the second time on the Nationwide Tour in 2010, at the Soboba Golf Classic. He finished the year 17th on the money list and earned his 2011 PGA Tour card. His second full season on the PGA Tour was a greater success, where he played in 28 events and made 15 cuts, including six top-25 finishes.

On 30 March 2014, Bowditch won his maiden title on the PGA Tour, at the Valero Texas Open. He won by a single stroke over Will MacKenzie and Daniel Summerhays, despite shooting a final four-over-par round of 76, which was the highest round shot by a winner on tour since 2004. The victory came in his 110th tour level start. The win qualified Bowditch to play in the Masters Tournament and the PGA Championship for the first time in his career.

On 31 May 2015, Bowditch won the AT&T Byron Nelson for his second PGA Tour title. He posted a score of −18 to finish four shots ahead of Charley Hoffman, Jimmy Walker and Scott Pinckney to claim a wire-to-wire victory. He became the third Australian to win the tournament in eight years, following Adam Scott in 2008 and Jason Day in 2010. The victory qualified Bowditch for the 2015 PGA Championship and the 2016 Masters Tournament. His play during the season was good enough to earn a captain's pick for the 2015 Presidents Cup and a career high world ranking of 54th.

Bowditch has long had a battle with severe depression and is a spokesman for beyondblue, an Australian non-profit organisation promoting awareness of depression and related mental disorders.

On 3 February 2017, Bowditch was arrested for extreme DUI in Scottsdale, Arizona.

Professional wins (7)

PGA Tour wins (2)

PGA Tour of Australasia wins (3)

1Co-sanctioned by the Nationwide Tour

PGA Tour of Australasia playoff record (0–1)

Nationwide Tour wins (2)

1Co-sanctioned by the PGA Tour of Australasia

Nationwide Tour playoff record (0–1)

Von Nida Tour wins (1)

*Note: The 2004 QLD Group Queensland Open was shortened to 54 holes due to weather.

Playoff record
Challenge Tour playoff record (0–1)

Results in major championships

CUT = missed the half-way cut
"T" = tied

Results in The Players Championship

CUT = missed the halfway cut
"T" indicates a tie for a place

Results in World Golf Championships
Results not in chronological order prior to 2015.

"T" = tied

Team appearances
Amateur
Nomura Cup (representing Australia): 2001 (winners)
Australian Men's Interstate Teams Matches (representing Queensland): 2000, 2001 (winners)

Professional
Presidents Cup (representing the International team): 2015

See also
2005 Nationwide Tour graduates
2010 Nationwide Tour graduates
2012 PGA Tour Qualifying School graduates

References

External links

Australian male golfers
PGA Tour golfers
PGA Tour of Australasia golfers
Korn Ferry Tour graduates
Sportspeople from Newcastle, New South Wales
People from the Sunshine Coast, Queensland
1983 births
Living people